Karsten Härtel (born 4 April 1961) is a former German footballer. He played as a goalkeeper at club level from the early-1980s to the mid-1990s. He is best known for playing for Hallescher FC from 1987 to 1989 in the DDR-Oberliga, the top level football league in East Germany. Following the German reunification, he played for Alemannia Aachen and Bonner SC.

References

External links
 

1961 births
Living people
Alemannia Aachen players
Association football goalkeepers
Bonner SC players
DDR-Oberliga players
East German footballers
FC Carl Zeiss Jena players
Hallescher FC players